Spin polarization is the degree to which the spin, i.e., the intrinsic angular momentum of elementary particles, is aligned with a given direction. This property may pertain to the spin, hence to the magnetic moment, of conduction electrons in ferromagnetic metals, such as iron, giving rise to spin-polarized currents. It may refer to (static) spin waves, preferential correlation
of spin orientation with ordered lattices (semiconductors or insulators).

It may also pertain to beams of particles, produced for particular aims, such as  polarized neutron scattering or muon spin spectroscopy. Spin polarization of electrons or of nuclei, often called simply magnetization, is also produced by the application of a magnetic field. Curie law is used to produce an induction signal in Electron spin resonance (ESR or EPR) and in Nuclear magnetic resonance (NMR).

Spin polarization is also important for spintronics, a branch of electronics. Magnetic semiconductors are being researched as possible spintronic materials.

The spin of free electrons is measured either by a LEED image from a clean wolfram-crystal (SPLEED) or by an electron microscope composed purely of electrostatic lenses and a gold foil as a sample. Back scattered electrons are decelerated by annular optics and focused onto a ring shaped electron multiplier at about 15°. The position on the ring is recorded. This whole device is called a Mott-detector. Depending on their spin the electrons have the chance to hit the ring at different positions. 1% of the electrons are scattered in the foil. Of these 1% are collected by the detector and then about 30% of the electrons hit the detector at the wrong position. Both devices work due to spin orbit coupling.

The circular polarization of electromagnetic fields is due to spin polarization of their constituent photons.

In the most generic context, spin polarization is any alignment of the components of a non-scalar
(vectorial, tensorial, spinor) field with its arguments, i.e., with the nonrelativistic three spatial or
relativistic four spatiotemporal regions over which it is defined. In this sense, it also includes
gravitational waves and any field theory that couples its constituents with the differential
operators of vector analysis.

See also
 Photon polarization
 Spin angular momentum of light
 Magnetization

References

Spectroscopy
Spintronics